Montebello Ionico is a comune (municipality) in the Province of Reggio Calabria in the Italian region Calabria, located about  southwest of Catanzaro and about  southeast of Reggio Calabria.

Montebello Ionico borders the following municipalities: Bagaladi, Melito di Porto Salvo, Motta San Giovanni, Reggio Calabria, San Lorenzo.

References

External links
 Official website

Cities and towns in Calabria